NK Vrsar is a Croatian football club based in the village of Vrsar.

Football clubs in Croatia
Football clubs in Istria County
Association football clubs established in 1955
1955 establishments in Croatia